Meilech Kohn is a contemporary Jewish singer. He has become popular after the release of the song "VeUhavtu".

Musical career 
Meilech Kohn (born Elimeilech Kohn) was brought up in a Satmar family in Williamsburg, Brooklyn. He is a first cousin of singer Lipa Schmeltzer.
He fell out of the Hasidic community he grew up in, although rejoined later in his adult life. The impact of this is evidenced in his music, being described as "a little bit of everything: Techno music, Mediterranean pop, touches of trip-hop, the musical patches of a life spent traveling, listening, and opening up the ears and the heart." In 2016 he released his hit song "VeUhavata" which became an "unexpected hit" as before then he was relatively unknown. The inspiration for the lyrics came from a Hasidic song about the power of brotherly love.

Kol Chai Radio host Menachem Toker described him as "the man who has conquered every stage, every wedding, every radio station in the world."

Discography

Albums

Singles 

 Venoihapoichhu (2015)
 Ein Trop Vasser (2016)
 VeUhavtu (2016)
 Yoimum (2017)
 V'zos Hatorah (2018)
 Layehudim (2019)
 Moshchani (2019)
 Al Tadin (2021)

References

External links
Music Video of VeUhavatu
Official website

Yiddish-language singers of the United States
Jewish American musicians
American Orthodox Jews
Living people
Jewish singers
Musicians from Brooklyn
1969 births
People from Williamsburg, Brooklyn
21st-century American Jews